The Loves of Casanova or Casanova is a 1927 French Historical drama film directed by Alexandre Volkoff and starring Ivan Mozzhukhin, Suzanne Bianchetti and Diana Karenne. The film portrays the life and adventures of Giacomo Casanova (1725-1798). Many of those involved with the film were Russian emigres who had come to France following the Russian Revolution.

Cast
Ivan Mosjoukine as Casanova
Suzanne Bianchetti as Catherine II
Diana Karenne as Maria, Duchess de Lardi
Jenny Jugo as Thérèse
Rina De Liguoro as Corticelli
Nina Koshetz as Countess Vorontzoff
Raymond Bouamerane as Djimmy
Olga Day as Lady Stanhope
Albert Decoeur as Duke of Bayreuth
Dimitri Dimitriev as Lord Stanhope
Paul Franceschi
Paul Guidé as Gregori Orloff  
Rudolf Klein-Rogge as Czar Peter III
Nathalie Lissenko
Michel Simon as henchman
Carlo Tedeschi as Menucci
Maria Ivogün as soprano

Costume design 
Boris Bilinsky designed with Barbara Karinska who went on to win an Oscar in 1948 for her color costume design on Joan of Arc.

References

External links

French historical drama films
French silent feature films
Films directed by Alexandre Volkoff
1920s historical drama films
Films about Giacomo Casanova
Cultural depictions of Catherine the Great
French black-and-white films
Cine-Allianz films
Pathé films
1927 drama films
Cultural depictions of Peter III of Russia
Silent historical drama films
1920s French films
1920s French-language films